Justus is a surname. Notable people with the surname include:

Buddy Justus (1952–1990), American spree killer
Carolyn K. Justus (born 1945), American politician
György Justus (1898–1945), Jewish Hungarian composer
Jolie Justus (born 1971), American lawyer and politician
Julian Justus (born 1988), German sports shooter
Klaus-Peter Justus (born 1951), East German retired middle distance runner
Larry T. Justus (1932–2002), American politician
May Justus (1898-1989), American writer of children's books
Roberto Justus (born 1955), Brazilian TV personality
Steffen Justus (born 1982), German triathlete

See also
Justice (surname)